Yıprak can refer to:

 Yıprak, Çerkeş
 Yıprak, Dinar